Spud 2: The Madness Continues is a 2013 South African comedy film written and directed by Donovan Marsh and starring Troye Sivan and John Cleese.  It is the sequel of the 2010 film Spud.

Cast
Troye Sivan as Spud
John Cleese as The Guv
Jason Cope as Sparerib
Jeremy Crutchley as The Glock
Sven Ruygrok as Rambo
Josh Goddard as Mad Dog
Travis Hornsby	as Boggo
Harold Hendricks as Death Breath
Byron Langley as Simon
Tanit Phoenix as Eve
Charlbi Dean Kriek as Amanda
Aaron McIlroy as Spud's Dad
Julie Summers as Spud's Mom
Blessing Xaba as Fatty

Reception
Radio Times awarded the film two stars out of five.

References

External links
 
 

South African comedy films
2013 comedy films
2013 films
English-language South African films
2010s English-language films